Scania is a genus of moths of the family Noctuidae. It is the sister group of Pseudoleucania.

Species 
Scania anelluspinata Olivares, 1994
Scania aspersa (Butler, 1882)
Scania messia (Guenée, 1852)
Scania neuquensis (Köhler, 1959)
Scania odontoclasper Olivares, 1994
Scania perlucida (Köhler, 1967)
Scania perornata (Köhler, 1959)
Scania simillima (Köhler, 1959)
Scania strigigrapha (Hampson, 1905)
Scania tephra (Köhler, 1945)

Further reading 
 Natural History Museum Lepidoptera genus database

Noctuinae
Moth genera